Whitewater Center may refer to:
U.S. National Whitewater Center, Charlotte, North Carolina
Ocoee Whitewater Center, near Ducktown, Tennessee, the canoe slalom venue for the 1996 Summer Olympics in Atlanta